Roméo Antonius Dallaire  (born June 25, 1946) is a Canadian humanitarian, author, retired senator and Canadian Forces lieutenant-general. Dallaire served as force commander of UNAMIR, the ill-fated United Nations peacekeeping force for Rwanda between 1993 and 1994, and attempted to stop the genocide that was being waged by Hutu extremists against the Tutsi people and Hutu moderates.

Dallaire founded The Roméo Dallaire Child Soldiers Initiative to help prevent the recruitment and use of child soldiers. He is a senior fellow at the Montreal Institute for Genocide and Human Rights Studies (MIGS) and co-director of the Will to Intervene Project which published a policy recommendation report, "Mobilizing the Will to Intervene: Leadership and Action to Prevent Mass Atrocities". He is the author of Shake Hands with the Devil.

Early life, education and early career
Dallaire was born in 1946 in Denekamp, Netherlands, to staff-sergeant Roméo Louis Dallaire, a non-commissioned officer in the Canadian Army, and Catherine Vermaessen, a Dutch nurse. After his father had been reassigned to Canada, his mother and Dallaire immigrated to Canada when the boy was six months old, traveling on the Empire Brent. They landed in Halifax on December 13, 1946. The family lived in Montreal during Dallaire's childhood. Dallaire is Catholic.

He enrolled in the Canadian Army in 1963, as a cadet at the Royal Military College Saint-Jean. In 1970 he graduated from the Royal Military College of Canada with a bachelor of science degree and was commissioned into the Royal Regiment of Canadian Artillery.

In 1971, Dallaire applied for a Canadian passport to travel overseas with his troops. He was surprised to learn that his birth in the Netherlands, although the son of a Canadian soldier, did not give him automatic Canadian citizenship. He has subsequently become a Canadian citizen.

Dallaire also attended the Canadian Land Force Command and Staff College, the United States Marine Corps Command and Staff College in Quantico, Virginia, and the British Higher Command and Staff Course.

He commanded the 5e Régiment d'artillerie légère du Canada. On July 3, 1989, he was promoted to the rank of brigadier-general. He commanded the 5 Canadian Mechanized Brigade Group. He was also the commandant of Collège militaire royal de Saint-Jean from 1989 to 1991.

Rwanda

Original mission
In late 1993, Dallaire received his commission as the major-general of UNAMIR, the United Nations Assistance Mission for Rwanda. UNAMIR's goal was to assist in the implementation of the Arusha Accords, a peace agreement intended to end the Rwandan Civil War. The UN attempted to negotiate with the Hutus in the Rwandan army and with Juvénal Habyarimana, a Hutu who was president at the time, and with the Tutsis, as represented by the rebel commander Paul Kagame, who led the Rwandan Patriotic Front (RPF) (he later was elected President of Rwanda). When Dallaire arrived in Rwanda, his mandate was to supervise the implementation of the accords during a transitional period in which Tutsis were to be given some positions of power within the Hutu-dominated government. When a French aircraft landed in Kigali, loaded with ammunition and weapons for the Rwandan Armed Forces, Dallaire notified the UN by fax, suggesting he seize these weapons to prevent violence, but the UN deemed this action to be beyond his mandate. In addition to the arms deliveries, he learned that troops from the Rwandan government began checking identity cards, which identified individuals by ethnicity as Hutu or Tutsi.

Genocide
On January 11, 1994, Dallaire sent his "Genocide Fax" to UN Headquarters. The fax stated that Dallaire was in contact with "a top level trainer in the cadre of Interhamwe-armed [sic] militia of MRND." The informant claimed to have been ordered to register all Tutsi in Kigali. According to the memo, the informant suspected that a genocide against the Tutsis was being planned, and he said that "in 20 minutes his personnel could kill up to 1000 Tutsis". Dallaire's request to protect the informant and his family and to raid the weapons caches he revealed was denied by the UN.

The result was a genocide of between 500,000 and 1,000,000. Seven out of every ten Tutsis were killed.

Roméo Dallaire learned of the Hutu Power movement during the mission's deployment, as well as plans for the mass extermination of Tutsi. He also became aware of secret weapons caches through an informant, but his request to raid them was turned down by the UN Department of Peacekeeping Operations (DPKO), which felt that Dallaire was exceeding his mandate and had to be kept "on a leash". Seizing the weapons was argued to be squarely within UNAMIR's mandate; both sides had requested UNAMIR and it had been authorized by the UN Security Council in Resolution 872.

UNAMIR's effectiveness in peacekeeping was also hampered by the Rwandan president, Juvénal Habyarimana and Hutu hardliners, and by April 1994, the Security Council threatened to terminate UNAMIR's mandate if it did not make progress.

Following the death of Habyarimana, and the start of the genocide, Dallaire liaised repeatedly with both the Crisis Committee and the Rwandan Patriotic Front (RPF), attempting to re-establish peace and prevent the resumption of the civil war. Neither side was interested in a ceasefire, the government because it was controlled by the genocidaires, and the RPF because the group considered fighting necessary to stop the killings. UNAMIR's Chapter VI mandate rendered it powerless to intervene militarily, and most of its Rwandan staff were killed in the early days of the genocide, severely limiting its ability to operate.

UNAMIR was therefore largely reduced to a bystander role, and Dallaire later labelled it a "failure". Its most significant contribution was to provide refuge for thousands of Tutsi and moderate Hutu at its headquarters in Amahoro Stadium, as well as other secure UN sites, and to assist with the evacuation of foreign nationals. On 12 April, the Belgian government, which was one of the largest troop contributors to UNAMIR, and had lost ten soldiers protecting the Rwandan prime minister, Agathe Uwilingiyimana, announced that it was withdrawing, reducing the force's effectiveness even further.

Dallaire was later severely criticized by the Belgian parliamentary commission for his role leading to the torture and murder of ten members of the 2nd Commando Battalion and their protected charge. While Lieutenant Lotin and his men were being tortured and murdered, Dallaire passed by within 60 metres. Seeing the Belgium soldiers, Dallaire did not intervene. In his answer to the martial council he would later say "I did not know whether they were dead or injured." He went on to meet officers of the Rwanda army at the Military School, but did not mention the event. The company of the Bangladeshi Battalion which had the task of Quick Reaction Force was ill prepared and did not leave their barracks. After those events Belgium withdrew its forces from Rwanda. Dallaire considered them to be his best-trained and best-equipped forces. The commission of inquiry of the Belgian Senate in 1998 severely condemned Dallaire’s actions during those days. According to the parliamentary commission Dallaire adopted an overly reserved attitude in the months before the genocide undermining the credibility of UNAMIR in the eyes of the Rwandans. Furthermore Dallaire’s actions were considered to be “imprudent and unprofessional to have the Belgian escorts provided on 7 April with so few military precautions”. In addition, the commission stated it "did not understand why general Dallaire, who had noted the blue beret bodies in the Kigali camp, did not communicate this immediately to the FAR'S high-ranking officers at the meeting of the École supérieure and did not demand the urgent intervention of those Rwandan officers present. This appears to reflect considerable indifference on his part. Moreover, general Dallaire also neglected to inform his sector commander about what he had seen and to give the necessary instructions". On 17 May 1994, the UN passed Resolution 918, which imposed an arms embargo and reinforced UNAMIR, which would be known as UNAMIR II. The new soldiers did not start arriving until June, and following the end of the genocide in July, the role of UNAMIR II was largely confined to maintaining security and stability, until its termination in 1996.

Several individuals attempted to halt the Rwandan genocide, or to shelter vulnerable Tutsi. Among them were Dallaire, Henry Kwami Anyidoho (Ghanaian deputy commander of UNAMIR), Pierantonio Costa (Italian diplomat who rescued many lives), Antonia Locatelli (Italian volunteer who in 1992, two years before the actual genocide, tried to save 300 or 400 Tutsis by calling officials in the international community and was later murdered by the Interahamwe), Jacqueline Mukansonera (Hutu woman who saved a Tutsi during the genocide), Zura Karuhimbi (Hutu elderly widow who sheltered more than 100 refugees in her village home, posing as a witch to repel and frighten militiamen), Paul Rusesabagina (the Academy Award nominated film Hotel Rwanda is based on his story), Carl Wilkens (the only American who chose to remain in Rwanda during the genocide), André Sibomana (Hutu priest and journalist who saved many lives) and Captain Mbaye Diagne (Senegalese army officer of UNAMIR who saved many lives before he was killed).

Dallaire gave the major force contributors different evaluations for their work. In his book, he gave the Tunisian and Ghanaian contingents high praise for their valiant and competent work. Three of Ghana's peacekeepers died in the warfare.

End to the genocide
As the massacre progressed and the press covered the genocide more widely, the UN Security Council backtracked and voted to establish UNAMIR II, with a strength of 5,500 men, in response to the French plan to occupy portions of the country. Dallaire initially opposed the so-called French Opération Turquoise, because the French had a history of backing the Hutus and the Rwandan Armed Forces. He believed their presence would be opposed by Kagame and the rebel RPF.

Life after Rwanda

Upon his return to Canada from UNOMUR and UNAMIR, Dallaire was appointed to two simultaneous commands in September 1994: deputy commander of Land Force Command in Saint-Hubert, Quebec and commander of 1st Canadian Division. In October 1995, Dallaire assumed command of Land Force Quebec Area.

In 1996, Dallaire was promoted as chief of staff and to the assistant deputy minister (personnel) group at National Defence Headquarters. In 1998, he was assigned to the assistant deputy minister (human resources – military) and in 1999 was appointed special advisor to the chief of the defence staff on Officer Professional Development.

Dallaire had post-traumatic stress disorder and in 2000, attempted suicide by combining alcohol with his anti-depressant medication, a near fatal combination which left him comatose. Dallaire is an outspoken supporter of raising awareness for veterans' mental health.

In January 2004, Dallaire appeared at the International Criminal Tribunal for Rwanda to testify against Colonel Théoneste Bagosora. The testimony was critical to the outcome of the trial and in December 2008 Bagosora was convicted of genocide and for the command responsibility of the murders of the 10 Belgian Peacekeepers. The trial chamber held that: "it is clear that the killing of the peacekeepers formed part of the widespread and systematic attack", while at the same time holding that: "the evidence suggests that these killings were not necessarily part of a highly coordinated plan." 

Dallaire later worked as a special advisor to the Government of Canada on War Affected Children and the Prohibition of Small Arms Distribution, as well as with international agencies with the same focus, including child labour. In 2004–2005, he served as a fellow at the Carr Center For Human Rights Policy at Harvard University's John F. Kennedy School of Government.

Appointment to the Senate
On March 24, 2005, Dallaire was appointed to the Senate of Canada by Governor General Adrienne Clarkson on the advice of Prime Minister Paul Martin. He represented the province of Quebec and sat as a Liberal until January 29, 2014, when he along with all of his Liberal Senate peers were removed from the party caucus by party leader Justin Trudeau, after which he officially sat as an Independent Liberal. Dallaire noted that his family has supported both the Liberal Party of Canada and the Quebec Liberal Party since 1958. He supported Michael Ignatieff's unsuccessful 2006 bid for the leadership of the federal Liberal Party.

In 2007, Dallaire called for the reopening of Collège militaire royal de Saint-Jean, saying "The possibility of starting a new program at the college – a military college that would allow all officer cadets to spend two years in Saint-Jean before going to Kingston, instead of studying only in Kingston – is being considered. In the spirit of progress, would it be possible to support a principle as basic as the freedom of francophones in the military by establishing a CEGEP-style francophone bilingual military college."

Concordia University announced on September 8, 2006, that Dallaire would sit as a senior fellow at the Montreal Institute for Genocide and Human Rights Studies (MIGS), a research centre based at the university's Faculty of Arts & Science. Later that month, on September 29, 2006, he issued a statement urging the international community to be prepared to defend Baháʼís in Iran from possible atrocities.

Dallaire has worked to bring understanding of post-traumatic stress disorder to the general public. His 2016 book, Waiting for First Light: My Ongoing Battle with PTSD, details his own struggles with this operational stress injury. He has been a visiting lecturer at several Canadian and American universities. He was a Fellow of the Carr Center for Human Rights Policy, Kennedy School of Government at Harvard University. He pursued research on conflict resolution and the use of child soldiers. He published the book, They Fight Like Soldiers, They Die Like Children: the Global Quest to Eradicate the Use of Child Soldiers in 2010. He has written several articles and chapters in publications on conflict resolution, humanitarian assistance and human rights.

In 2013, Senator Dallaire voiced his concern objecting to the 2014 budget closure of nine Veterans Affairs Canada (VAC) offices and the dismissal of 900 VAC staff as well $226 million of funding cut from the program. Early in Dallaire's post military career he was tasked by the Department of National Defense (DND) to create a program to support the rehabilitation needs of former military personnel.

Dallaire is a supporter of the Campaign for the Establishment of a United Nations Parliamentary Assembly, an organization which advocates for democratic reformation of the United Nations.

On December 3, 2013, Dallaire was in a car accident on Parliament Hill, Ottawa. His car, a black BMW, hit a lamp post before it was stopped. Dallaire said he had fallen asleep at the wheel due to stress. His vehicle's air bag deployed and there were no casualties.

Dallaire resigned from the Senate on June 17, 2014, seven years prior to reaching mandatory retirement. He decided to leave the Senate to spend more time public speaking, to research post-traumatic stress disorder and his own struggles with it, and due to his frustration with the Canadian Senate expenses scandal, and to devote the majority of his time on the issue of eradicating the use of child soldiers through his Roméo Dallaire Child Soldiers Initiative.

Books

Dallaire has written three books. Shake Hands with the Devil: The Failure of Humanity in Rwanda, written with Major Brent Beardsley and published in 2003, chronicles his tour as force commander of UNAMIR in 1993–1994, during which he witnessed the Rwandan Genocide. It won the 2003 Shaughnessy Cohen Award for Political Writing, and the 2004 Governor General's Award for nonfiction. It was subsequently adapted for two films, a documentary and a feature film.

They Fight Like Soldiers, They Die Like Children: The Global Quest to Eradicate the Use of Child Soldiers (written with Jessica Dee Humphreys) was published in 2010. It discusses the phenomenon of child soldiers, and proposes solutions to eradicate it. It was one of The Globe and Mail's best books of 2010.

Waiting for First Light: My Ongoing Battle with PTSD (also with Jessica Dee Humphreys) is Dallaire's account of his struggles with post-traumatic stress disorder after his time in Rwanda. It was selected as one of the National Post's top books of 2016.

Books about Roméo Dallaire
The Lion, the Fox, and the Eagle: a story of generals and justice in Rwanda and Yugoslavia by Carol Off.

A Problem from Hell: America and the Age of Genocide by Samantha Power. In a 2004 opinion article published by The New York Times, Dallaire called upon NATO to intervene militarily alongside African Union troops to abort the genocide in Darfur. He concluded that, "having called what is happening in Darfur genocide and having vowed to stop it, it is time for the West to keep its word as well."

Roméo Dallaire Child Soldiers Initiative 

Dallaire founded the Roméo Dallaire Child Soldiers Initiative. The Initiative was one of the sponsors, with Dalhousie University, of a conference at the University on human rights and child soldiers.

Documentary and film

In October 2002, the documentary film The Last Just Man was released, which chronicles the Rwandan genocide and features interviews with Dallaire, Brent Beardsley, and others involved in the events that happened in Rwanda. It was directed by Steven Silver.

A character loosely based on Dallaire was portrayed by Nick Nolte in Hotel Rwanda (2004). He was portrayed by Guy Thauvette in a small role in the 2006 film A Sunday in Kigali.

A documentary film, entitled Shake Hands with the Devil: The Journey of Roméo Dallaire, which was inspired by the book and shows Dallaire's return to Rwanda after ten years, was produced by CBC-Radio Canada and White Pine Pictures, and released in 2004. The film was nominated for two Sundance Film Festival Awards, winning the 2004 Sundance Film Festival Audience Award for World Cinema – Documentary and a nomination for Grand Jury Prize for World Cinema – Documentary. The film aired on CBC on January 31, 2005. Shake Hands With The Devil won the Emmy Award for Outstanding Documentary with the US Documentary Channel, who presented it on their channel.

In 2004, PBS Frontline featured a documentary named The Ghosts of Rwanda. In an interview conducted for the documentary and recorded over the course of four days in October 2003, Dallaire said: "Rwanda will never ever leave me. It's in the pores of my body. My soul is in those hills, my spirit is with the spirits of all those people who were slaughtered and killed that I know of, and many that I didn't know ..."

A Canadian dramatic feature film Shake Hands with the Devil adapted from Roméo Dallaire's 2003 book and starring Roy Dupuis as Lieutenant-General Dallaire, started production in mid-June 2006, and was released on September 28, 2007. Dallaire participated in a press conference about the film held on June 2, 2006, in Montreal, a film for which he was being consulted. The film earned 12 Genie Award nominations and won one in the category Best Achievement in Music – Original Song for the song "Kaya" by Valanga Khoza and David Hirschfelder.

Awards and recognition
In 1996, Dallaire was made an officer of the Legion of Merit of the United States for his service in Rwanda. Dallaire was also awarded the inaugural Aegis Trust Award in 2002, and on October 10 of the same year, he was inducted as an Officer in the Order of Canada. Dallaire was named a Grand Officer of the National Order of Quebec in 2005. He was granted the inaugural Aegis Award for Genocide Prevention from the Aegis Trust (United Kingdom). On March 9, 2005, Dallaire was awarded the 25th Pearson Medal of Peace.

In 2019 (the 25th anniversary of the Genocide in Rwanda), the Government of Canada announced the establishment of the Dallaire Centre for Peace and Security. That same year, Dallaire was awarded the Nelson Mandela Award for Human Rights, the University of Victoria's Huminatis Award, and was also awarded the Adrienne Clarkson Prize for Global Citizenship.

Dallaire has received honorary doctorates from a large number of Canadian and American universities. He received doctor of laws degrees from the University of Guelph, University of Saskatchewan, St. Thomas University, Boston College, the University of Calgary, Memorial University of Newfoundland, Athabasca University, Trent University, the University of Victoria, the University of Western Ontario, Concordia University, and Simon Fraser University, an honorary doctor of humanities degree from the University of Lethbridge and honorary degrees from the University of Northern British Columbia and the University of York. On June 1, 2006, Dallaire was awarded a doctorate of humane letters by the Queens College of the City University of New York (CUNY) in recognition of his efforts in Rwanda and afterwards to speak out against genocide. He received an ovation from the crowd for his comment that "no human is more human than any other". Dallaire received the Loyola Medal from Concordia University in 2006. Dallaire was named a fellow of the Ryerson University, and an honorary fellow of the Royal College of Physicians and Surgeons of Canada. On October 11, 2006, the Center for Unconventional Security Affairs at the University of California, Irvine awarded Dallaire with the 2006 Human Security Award.

Dallaire was appointed the 2020/2021 Cleveringa Chair at Leiden University in the Netherlands.

In 2002, Dallaire was given Canada's World Peace Award, in recognition of his peacekeeping experience and study of children in conflict, by the World Federalist Movement-Canada Dallaire planted a tree at the Kofi Annan International Peacekeeping Training Centre, Accra, Ghana in 2007 at the invitation of the commandant, Major-General John Attipoe. Dallaire was a recipient of the Vimy Award.

As part of the 50th Anniversary commemoration of the founding of the Pugwash Peace Exchange, in 2007 Dallaire accepted Sir Joseph Rotblat's Nobel Peace Prize.

Dallaire was one of the eight Olympic Flag bearers at the opening ceremony for the 2010 Olympic Winter Games, in Vancouver.

The CBC's The Greatest Canadian program saw Dallaire voted, in 16th place, as the highest rated military figure.

There are elementary schools named after Dallaire in Winnipeg, Manitoba, Ajax, Ontario, and a French-immersion elementary school in Maple, Ontario. There is also a French high school in Barrie, Ontario. that is named for Dallaire. Also, a street is named after him in the Lincoln Park neighbourhood of Calgary, Alberta.

Decorations
Dallaire's personal awards and decorations include the following:

100px

86px

100px

100px

109px

Dallaire has earned the Canadian Forces Jump Wings.

See also
Role of the international community in the Rwandan genocide

Notes

References

Further reading

External links

Official site 
 

|-

 
1946 births
Living people
People from Denekamp
Officers of the Order of Canada
Grand Officers of the National Order of Quebec
Canadian generals
Canadian humanitarians
Royal Regiment of Canadian Artillery personnel
Canadian non-fiction writers
French Quebecers
Canadian people of Dutch descent
Canadian senators from Quebec
Governor General's Award-winning non-fiction writers
People with post-traumatic stress disorder
Royal Military College of Canada alumni
Royal Military College Saint-Jean alumni
Harvard Fellows
Liberal Party of Canada senators
Recipients of the Meritorious Service Decoration
People of the Rwandan genocide
Writers from Quebec
Officers of the Legion of Merit
United Nations military personnel
21st-century Canadian politicians
Canadian officials of the United Nations
Canada–Rwanda relations
Canadian Roman Catholics